Ophélie Bau is a French actress best known for her roles in Mektoub, My Love: Canto Uno and its sequel Mektoub, My Love: Intermezzo.

Early life
Bau was born Ophélie Baufle in Montpellier and grew up in Besançon where she was crowned miss Besançon in 2014.

Career
Bau made her acting debut in the 2017 film Mektoub, My Love: Canto Uno. While the film received mixed reviews Bau's performance was widely praised. She won the 2019 Lumières Award for “Best female newcomer” for her role in the film and was nominated in the same category at the César awards.

Bau appeared in the 2019 sequel to Mektoub, Mektoub, My Love: Intermezzo. Shortly before the film premiered at the Cannes Film Festival in 2019 news broke that the film featured an unsimulated sex scene between her and a co-star and that they had been pressured into drinking heavily to complete the scene by the film's director Abdellatif Kechiche. Bau attended the premiere of the film but walked out of the screening and did not attend a press conference for the film. In 2020 in an interview she revealed she walked away from the premiere because she had asked Kechiche to allow her to view the sex scene in private before it was screened in public, a request which he denied.

References

1992 births
Living people
French film actresses
Actors from Besançon
Most Promising Actress Lumières Award winners